The North Albany Clubhouse stands by itself in rural Albany County, Wyoming. It was built in 1928 as a community meeting center by local residents. It continues to serve as a community social center. The clubhouse was placed on the National Register of Historic Places on July 23, 1998.

References

External links
 North Albany Clubhouse at the Wyoming State Historic Preservation Office

National Register of Historic Places in Albany County, Wyoming
Buildings and structures completed in 1928